Encheliophis is a genus of pearlfishes, with six currently recognized species:
 Encheliophis boraborensis  (Kaup, 1856) (pinhead pearlfish)
 Encheliophis chardewalli Parmentier, 2004
 Encheliophis gracilis (Bleeker, 1856) (graceful pearlfish)
 Encheliophis homei (J. Richardson, 1846) (silver pearlfish)
 Encheliophis sagamianus (S. Tanaka (I), 1908)
 Encheliophis vermicularis J. P. Müller, 1842 (worm pearlfish)
 Encheliophis vermiops Markle & Olney, 1990 (pygmy pearlfish)

References

External links
 Encheliophis on animaldiversity.ummz.umich.edu